AMG-333 is a drug which acts as a potent and selective blocker of the TRPM8 ion channel, which is the main receptor responsible for the sensation of cold. It was developed as a potential treatment for migraine.

See also
 PF-05105679
 RQ-00203078

References 

Pyridines
Trifluoromethyl ethers
Amides
Fluoroarenes
Carboxylic acids